is a railway station in the city of  Toyohashi, Aichi Prefecture, Japan, operated by the Public–private partnership Toyohashi Railroad.

Lines
Yagyu-bashi Station is a station of the Atsumi Line, and is located 1.0 kilometers from the starting point of the line at Shin-Toyohashi Station.

Station layout
The station has one side platforms serving a single bi-directional track. The station is unattended.

Adjacent stations

|-
!colspan=5|Toyohashi Railroad

Station history
On June 1 of the same year, it as renamed to its present name. On July 21 of the same year, a spur line operated by the Toyohashi Electric Tram network connected to the station. This service was discontinued in 1978. On September 1, 1940, the Atsumi Railway became part of the Nagoya Railway system, and was spun out again as the Toyohashi Railway on October 1, 1954.

Passenger statistics
In fiscal 2017, the station was used by an average of 1345 passengers daily.

Surrounding area
Japan National Route 259

See also
 List of railway stations in Japan

References

External links

Toyohashi Railway Official home page

Railway stations in Aichi Prefecture
Railway stations in Japan opened in 1925
Toyohashi